The 1925–26 NCAA championships were contested by the NCAA during the 1925–26 collegiate academic school year, the NCAA's fifth year of hosting championships, to determine the team and individual national champions of its two sponsored sports.

Before the introduction of the separate University Division and [NCAA Division II|College Division]] before the 1955–56 school year, the NCAA only conduced a single national championship for each sport. Women's sports were not added until 1981–82.

Championships

Season results

Team titles, by university
No official team titles awarded this season

Cumulative results

Team titles, by university

References

1925 in American sports
1926 in American sports